Alan Garnett Davenport (September 19, 1932 – July 19, 2009) was a professor at the University of Western Ontario and founder of its Boundary Layer Wind Tunnel Laboratory.   He analyzed the wind's effect on a significant portion of the world's tallest buildings including the building formerly known as the CN Tower, Sears Tower, Citicorp Center, and the World Trade Center.   He was a Member of the Order of Canada, Canada's highest civilian honor.

Early life
Davenport was born in Madras, India and grew up in South Africa, attending Michaelhouse.  He studied at Cambridge University for his B.A. and M.A. in mechanical science.  He went on to receive an M.A.Sc. from the University of Toronto and a Ph.D. from the University of Bristol.  His thesis of "The Treatment of Wind Loads on Tall Towers and Long Span Bridges in the Turbulent Wind" was the focus of his professional career.

He also served as a pilot in the Royal Canadian Navy.

He married Sheila Smith, with whom he had four children.

Research
Davenport and his laboratory contributed to the engineering and design of many tall buildings and bridges, including the Willis Tower, the World Trade Center and the Tsing Ma Bridge.  They analyzed the wind flow and load over the structures using wind tunnels, detecting vulnerabilities which required compensating changes in the design.

He was a founding editor of the Canadian Journal of Civil Engineering and was the founding research director for the Institute of Catastrophic Loss Reduction, a 1999 partnership between the University of Western Ontario and the Insurance board of Canada.  Its goal is to improve construction practices and standards to better withstand extreme weather conditions.

Davenport authored more than 200 scientific papers during his career.

He was presented with the Gerhard Herzberg Canada Gold Medal for Science and Engineering in 1994, and the Albert Caquot Award in 2001.  He was appointed a Member of the Order of Canada on May 1, 2002 for a lifetime of achievement.

He was honored with the Lynn S. Beedle Lifetime Achievement Award from the Council on Tall Buildings and Urban Habitat in 2005.

Retirement
He died in London, Ontario due to complications from Parkinson's disease

References

1932 births
2009 deaths
Alumni of the University of Cambridge
Alumni of the University of Bristol
Royal Canadian Navy officers
Academic staff of the University of Western Ontario
Members of the Order of Canada
Fellows of the Engineering Institute of Canada
20th-century Canadian engineers
University of Toronto alumni
Alumni of Michaelhouse